James Sutherland may refer to:

Politics
James Sutherland (Wisconsin politician) (1820–?), Wisconsin politician
James Sutherland (Canadian politician) (1849–1905), Canadian politician
James Miller Sutherland (1853–1921), lawyer and political figure in Prince Edward Island, Canada

Sports
James T. Sutherland (1870–1955), "Father of Hockey"
James Sutherland (footballer) (1881–?), Scottish footballer who played as a winger
Jim Sutherland (Australian footballer) (1900–1973), Australian rules footballer
Jim Sutherland (1914–1980), American football coach
James Sutherland (cricket administrator) (born 1965), CEO of Cricket Australia

Other
James Sutherland (botanist) (died 1719), first professor of botany at the University of Edinburgh, from 1676 to 1705
James H. Sutherland (1872–1932), Scottish born soldier and elephant hunter
James Sutherland (Nip/Tuck), fictional character in American television series
James W. Sutherland (1918–1987), United States Army general
James Runcieman Sutherland, English literary scholar
James Sutherland, 2nd Lord Duffus, Scottish nobleman

See also
 James Southerland, American basketball player